Betula austrosinensis is a species of birch that is endemic to China where it is found on elevation of . It occurs in the broaded-leaved forests of southern China.

Description
It also have membranous wings and it blooms from June to August while the flowers come out from May to June.

References

austrosinensis
Endemic flora of China
Trees of China
Plants described in 1979